Conicosia pugioniformis is a species of succulent plant in the ice plant family known by the common names narrow-leaved iceplant and pigroot. It is native to South Africa and it is known on other continents as an introduced species and sometimes a noxious weed. It is an invasive species on the Central Coast of California, where it is a minor threat to native coastal vegetation, although not as harmful as other species of invasive iceplant. This is a short-lived perennial herb growing from an underground caudex. It can sprout vegetatively from the caudex if its aboveground parts are destroyed. The fingerlike leaves are fleshy, gray-green, hairless, and up to 20 centimeters long. The inflorescence is a solitary, malodorous flower up to 8 centimeters wide. It has rings of up to 250 thin petals.

References

External links
Jepson Manual Treatment
Photo gallery

Aizoaceae
Endemic flora of South Africa
Flora of the Cape Provinces
Fynbos
Taxa named by N. E. Brown
Taxa named by Carl Linnaeus